Milecastle 6 (Benwell Grove) was a milecastle of the Roman Hadrian's Wall.

Construction
The exact location of this milecastle is unknown but the wall in this area runs beneath the A186.  The area is built over with roads and terraced houses and no milecastle remains are known.

Excavations and investigations
In 1966 J Collingwood Bruce suggested that the site of Milecastle 6 lay beneath the Benwell Grove road in Newcastle.

Associated turrets
Each milecastle on Hadrian's Wall had two associated turret structures.  These turrets were positioned approximately one-third and two-thirds of a Roman mile to the west of the Milecastle, and would probably have been manned by part of the milecastle's garrison.  The turrets associated with Milecastle 6 are known as Turret 6A and Turret 6B.

Turret 6A
Turret 6A has never been located from its remains. It has been positioned from the average distance to Turret 6B. This places it underneath the houses and road of Westholme Gardens in Benwell.

Location:

Turret 6B
Turret 6B (Benwell Hill) was discovered by Robert Shafto in 1751, during construction of the Military Road, Shafto stated that it was approximately  square. This places it somewhere near to the modern road of Two Ball Lonnen. All surface trace of the turret had been obliterated by modern development by 1968.

Location:

Monument records

References

06